SYMA Sports and Conference Centre (SYMA Sport- és Rendezvényközpont) is a sports facility in Budapest, Hungary, which opened on 1 September 2006. SYMA has 3 halls: Hall 'A' is 8000 m², Hall 'B' is 5200 m², Hall 'C' is 2800 m². SYMA is used for sports events, concerts, conferences and exhibitions.

Hall 'A' has a maximum capacity of around 5,500 for sport events but concerts can accommodate more people, up to 10,000.

References

Buildings and structures in Budapest
Tourist attractions in Budapest
Sports venues in Budapest